Ruzicka Goerz Anton syndrome is a rare genetic disease described by Ruzicka et al. in 1981. It is characterized by icthyosis (rough, scaly skin), deafness, intellectual disability, and skeletal anomalies.

It is also known as "Ichthyosis deafness intellectual disability skeletal anomalies".

Symptoms
The primary symptoms of Ruzicka Goerz Anton syndrome include ichthyosis, deafness, oligophrenia, and skeletal deformities.

Diagnosis

Treatment
Therapy with Ro 10-9359, a retinoid derivative, results in improvement of the ichthyosis portion of the syndrome.

History
In 1981, a case was studied by Ruzicka et al. of a 15-year-old girl. The patient had ichthyosis congenita as well as deafness and retarded mental development. Further studies showed several skeletal deformities including brachydactyly, clinodactyly, and extra ribs. One year earlier, the patient had developed thyroid carcinoma, but whether or not this is due to the syndrome is unknown. The patient was treated with an oral retinoid, which greatly improved the patient's ichthyosis.

See also
 Ichthyosis
 Brachydactyly
 Clinodactyly

References

External links 

 Ruzicka Goerz Anton syndrome at the Genetic and Rare Diseases Information Center
 Causes of Ichthyosis at RightDiagnosis.com

Genetic diseases and disorders
Syndromes